Greater Bay Airlines Company Limited (GBA), is a Hong Kong-based Low Cost Carrier established as Donghai Airlines in 2010, and rebranded in July 2020 as Greater Bay Airlines. The company's inaugural passenger flight (from Hong Kong to Bangkok) was conducted in July 2022.

History 

The company was founded on 24 May 2010, as a subsidiary of East Pacific (Holdings) Ltd. At that time, the airline was called Donghai Airlines. On 17 January 2019, the airline's name changed to Donghai Airlines (Hong Kong) Limited, while on 5 December 2019 the airline renamed as Hong Kong Bauhinia Airlines. On 8 July 2020, the airline was again renamed, to Greater Bay Airlines.

During Greater Bay Airline's application to become a certified airline, the process was delayed due to concerns expressed by rivals Cathay Pacific, HK Express and Hong Kong Airlines. As in February 2021, those airlines submitted position statements ("representations") rather than objections in response to GBA's application to the Hong Kong Transport and Housing Bureau. Meanwhile, the company plans to rely on cargo services till COVID-19 travel restrictions are lifted.

In September 2021, Greater Bay Airlines received its first aircraft, an ex-Norwegian Air International 2017-build Boeing 737-800 leased from the company ICBC Financial Leasing. Its first charter flight was on 29 November 2021 and was a same-day round trip from Hong Kong to Bangkok, just after the airline received its Air Operator's Certificate in October 2021. In February 2022, it was granted the Air Transport License of Hong Kong, which allows Greater Bay Airlines operating secluded flights. A second aircraft was leased in March 2022, compared with the seven aircraft originally planned.

Greater Bay Airlines first passenger flight occurred from Hong Kong to Bangkok on 23 July 2022. As of August 2022, the company's plans are to fly this route on Wednesdays and Saturdays.

Senior leadership 
Since Algernon Yau, the founding CEO left the airline and serve as the secretary for the Commerce and Economic Development Bureau with the newly formed administration of the Hong Kong Government, Bill Wong, the Chairman of Greater Bay Airlines has named board member Stanley Hui as its new Chief Executive, effective on 26 June 2022.

 Chairman: Bill Wong (since May 2010)
 Chief Executive: Stanley Hui (since June 2022)

List of former chief executives 

 Algernon Yau (2021–2022)

Destinations
On 22 January 2021, Greater Bay Airlines applied a total of 104 routes from Hong Kong to Mainland China, Japan, Taiwan, Korea, and Southeast Asia.

Passenger

Fleet

See also

 Donghai Airlines
 List of airlines of Hong Kong

References

Airlines of Hong Kong
Airlines established in 2010
Hong Kong brands
2010 establishments in Hong Kong